Syrphocheilosia  is a genus of hoverflies.

Species
S. aterrima Stackelberg, 1964
S. claviventris (Strobl, 1909)

References

Diptera of Europe
Hoverfly genera
Taxa named by Aleksandr Stackelberg